Uprising in Montenegro may refer to:
Christmas Uprising (1919), against the union with Serbia
13 July Uprising (1941), against Axis occupation during World War II